José Alberto Teixeira Regalo (born 22 November 1963) is a Portuguese long-distance runner. He competed in the men's 5000 metres at the 1988 Summer Olympics.

References

1963 births
Living people
Athletes (track and field) at the 1988 Summer Olympics
Portuguese male long-distance runners
Olympic athletes of Portugal
Place of birth missing (living people)